A vesicular transport protein, or vesicular transporter, is a membrane protein that regulates or facilitates the movement of specific molecules across a vesicle's membrane. As a result, vesicular transporters govern the concentration of molecules within a vesicle.

Types
Examples include: 
 Archain
 ARFs
 Clathrin
 Caveolin
 Dynamin and related proteins, such as the EHD protein family
 Rab proteins
 SNAREs
 Vesicular transport adaptor proteins e.g. Sorting nexins
 Synaptotagmin
 TRAPP complex
 Synaptophysin
 Auxilin

Pathways
There are multiple pathways, each using its own coat and GTPase.

 COP 1 (Cytosolic coat protein complex ) : retrograde transport; Golgi ----> Endoplasmic reticulum
 COP 2 (Cytosolic coat protein complex ) : anterograde transport; RER -----> cis-Golgi
 Clathrin : trans-Golgi  ----> Lysosomes, Plasma membrane ----> Endosomes (receptor-mediated endocytosis)

See also
 Membrane transport protein
 Wikipedia:MeSH D12.776#MeSH D12.776.543.990 --- vesicular transport proteins

References

Vesicular transport proteins
Peripheral membrane proteins